Md. Shawkat Ali (born 1928 or 1929) is a politician of Dinajpur District, Bangladesh, and former member of parliament for constituency Dinajpur-5.

Career 
Shawkat is a lawyer. He was elected to parliament for Dinajpur-5 as an Awami League (Mizam) candidate in the 1979 Bangladeshi general election.

References 

Living people
Year of birth missing (living people)
People from Dinajpur District, Bangladesh
Bangladesh Nationalist Party politicians
2nd Jatiya Sangsad members